Kalonda Airport  is an airstrip serving Tshikapa in Kasaï Province, Democratic Republic of the Congo.

See also

Transport in the Democratic Republic of the Congo
List of airports in Democratic Republic of the Congo

References

External links
OpenStreetMap - Kalonda
Google Maps - Kalonda
OurAirports - Kalonda
FallingRain - Kalonda Airport

Airports in Kasaï Province